Marcos Daniel was the defending champion, but he lost against Yuri Schukin in the semifinals.
Schukin won in the final 6–3, 7–5, against Santiago Ventura.

Seeds

Draw

Finals

Top half

Bottom half

External Links
Main Draw
Qualifying Singles

Zagreb Open - Singles
Zagreb Open